Beloyarsky is an urban locality (a work settlement) in Beloyarsky of Sverdlovsk Oblast, Russia. Population:

History
Work settlement status was granted to it in 1959.

Administrative and municipal status
Within the framework of administrative divisions, Beloyarsky is subordinated to Beloyarsky District. As a municipal division, the work settlement of Beloyarsky together with forty-four rural localities in Beloyarsky District is incorporated as Beloyarsky Urban Okrug.

References

Notes

Sources

Urban-type settlements in Sverdlovsk Oblast
Perm Governorate